Kuźnica Drawska is a settlement in the administrative district of Gmina Czaplinek, within Drawsko County, West Pomeranian Voivodeship, in north-western Poland.

Before 1772 the area was part of Kingdom of Poland, 1772–1871 Prussia, 1871–1945 Germany. It was a royal village of the Polish Crown. For more on its history, see Drahim County.

References

Villages in Drawsko County